Lawrence S. Gwozdz (born April 1, 1953) is an American classical saxophonist, composer, and former professor of saxophone at The University of Southern Mississippi. His successor is Dr. Dannel Espinoza.

Born to Polish-American parents in Niagara Falls, New York, Gwozdz was a pupil and longtime friend of saxophone pioneer Sigurd Raschèr.

Career

Performing 
He has performed in Beijing, Chicago, Leipzig, London, Los Angeles, Manchester, Prague, St. Louis, Warsaw, Zagreb, Zurich, and other cities in the US and abroad. His festival appearances have included the Yehudi Menuhin Festival, the International Chamber Music Festival of Le Touquet, Spoleto Festival USA .

Gwozdz is active in promoting, performing, and recording contemporary music. Composers including Samuel Adler, Walter Hartley, Zdenek Lukas, Armand Russell, Robert Starer, Roger Vogel, and John Worley have dedicated new chamber works to him. Gwozdz has also premiered full saxophone concertos by American composers Stephen Dankner, Alan Theisen, and Randall Snyder. Having been born with spina bifida, Gwozdz is also an advocate for arts for people with disabilities.

His performance with I Solisti di Zagreb motivated the press to write, "Gwozdz uses his instrument with superiority and virtuosity" (Vjesnik).

Gwozdz's Carnegie Hall debut was described in Musical America as an "extraordinary performance of contemporary music" with "the kind of timbre Adolphe Sax most likely had in mind ... always with subtlety and taste" (The New York Concert Review). On television, Gwozdz appeared with organist Diane Bish on The Joy of Music, and has performed concerti and recitals on radio for the Dame Myra Hess series (Public Radio International), Czech Radio-Prague, Croatian Radio, Minnesota Public Radio, and other networks.

Teaching
As professor of saxophone at The University of Southern Mississippi, he established a dedicated studio. His students have performed by invitation in major cities, including performances at Washington's Kennedy Center) as soloists, quartets, and as the Sax-Chamber Orchestra.
Gwozdz's students have included:
Harry Kinross White
Alan Theisen
Jonathan Bergeron
Chris Condon
Thomas Giles
Steffen Haß
Adam Muller
Brian Kauth
Dave Wozniak
Brian S. Ransom
Curt Altarac
Patrick McLaughlin
Marcus Ballard
Jeffrey Humphrey
Ron Gann
David Wright

His annotated translation of the book Das Saxophon by Jaap Kool from German into English was published by Egon Publishers Ltd (Herts, England) in 1987.

Sax-Chamber Orchestra
The Sax-Chamber Orchestra is an ensemble of eleven saxophonists founded by Gwozdz in the 1980s. Under Gwozdz's baton, they have been active in promoting the saxophone as a concert medium for over twenty years. The S-CO has premiered several large works composed specifically for them, and have showcased these compositions at venues such as the World Saxophone Congress. The ensemble, whose musicians are auditioned yearly, all play using mouthpieces constructed from Adolphe Sax's original patents. The Sax-Chamber Orchestra comprises typical members of the saxophone family (soprano, alto, tenor, baritone) as well as the less common sopranino and bass saxophones.

Available recordings
Raschèr International
An American Concerto: Tribute to Sigurd Raschèr (1999) (with the Bohuslav Martinu Philharmonic) Albany Records TROY 331
Simply Gifts
Hurricane (includes Stephen Dankner's Concerto for Alto Saxophone and Orchestra) (with The Louisiana Philharmonic Orchestra)
Special Hand'ling (2001) (music by George Frideric Handel arranged for saxophone, cello and harpsichord) Romeo Records 7216
Glazunov and Erland von Koch: Concerti (with the Plovdiv Philharmonic)
America Remembers (conducting the Sax-Chamber Orchestra)
Parabolically Bach (conducting the Sax-Chamber Orchestra) Romeo Records

References

External links
Lawrence Gwozdz's home page at the USM School of Music

1953 births
American classical saxophonists
American male saxophonists
American people of Polish descent
Living people
People with spina bifida
21st-century American saxophonists
21st-century American male musicians